Ellender Memorial High School, is a public high school located in Houma, Louisiana, United States. It is within the Terrebonne Parish School District and is the fourth public high school to open in that district.

Ellender Memorial High School was named after United States Senator Allen Joseph Ellender.

In In 2008, two co-valedictorians used a Vietnamese phrase to thank their families during their graduation speech. After the incident, the School Board proposed rules to require that graduation speeches use only English. This proposal was met with heavy backlash and was rejected.

School uniforms
The school requires its students to wear school uniforms. The school's designated alternate shirt colors are "Royal Blue" and Navy Blue.

Athletics
Ellender Memorial High athletics competes in the LHSAA.

References

External links 
 
 Terrebonne Parish School Board website

1976 establishments in Louisiana
Educational institutions established in 1976
Public high schools in Louisiana
Schools in Terrebonne Parish, Louisiana